The 2016 FST Grupa Brokerska Toruń FIM Speedway Grand Prix was the tenth race of the 2016 Speedway Grand Prix season. It took place on 1 October at the Rose MotoArena in Toruń, Poland.

Riders 
The Speedway Grand Prix Commission nominated Paweł Przedpełski as the wild card, and Kacper Woryna and Oskar Bober both as Track Reserves. Second series reserve Michael Jepsen Jensen replaced the injured Nicki Pedersen.

Results 
The Grand Prix was won by Niels Kristian Iversen, who beat Greg Hancock, Bartosz Zmarzlik and Matej Žagar in the final. It was Iversen's first win of the season. World championship leader Jason Doyle was injured in the third heat and took no further part in the meeting, meaning Hancock took the overall lead.

Heat details

The intermediate classification

References

See also 
 motorcycle speedway

Grand
Poland
October 2016 sports events in Europe